The Garden Route (Afrikaans: Tuinroete) is a  stretch of the south-eastern coast of South Africa which extends from Witsand in the Western Cape to the border of Tsitsikamma Storms River in the Eastern Cape. The name comes from the verdant and ecologically diverse vegetation encountered here and the numerous estuaries and lakes dotted along the coast. It includes towns such as Knysna, Plettenberg Bay, Mossel Bay, Oudtshoorn, Great Brak River, Little Brak River, Wilderness, Sedgefield and Nature's Valley; with George, the Garden Route's largest city and main administrative centre.
 
It has an oceanic climate, with mild to warm summers, and mild to cool winters. Temperatures rarely fall below 10 °C in winter and rarely climb beyond 28 °C in summer. Rain occurs year-round, with a slight peak in the spring months, brought by the humid sea-winds from the Indian Ocean rising and releasing their precipitation along the Outeniqua and Tsitsikamma Mountains just inland of the coast.

The Route is sandwiched between the aforementioned mountains and the Indian Ocean, with mountain passes, including the Outeniqua Pass, linking the area with the arid Little Karoo. The Outeniqua and Tsitsikamma indigenous forests are a unique mixture of Cape Fynbos and Temperate Forest and offer hiking trails and eco-tourism activities. Nearly 300 species of birdlife are to be found in a variety of habitats ranging from fynbos to forest to wetlands.

In 2017 the Garden Route was added to UNESCO's World Network of Biosphere Reserves.

See also

 George, Western Cape
 Knysna
 Plettenberg Bay
 Mossel Bay
 Oudtshoorn
 Bloukrans Bridge Bungy
 Tsitsikamma
 Guided hikes on the Garden Route

References

Tourism in the Western Cape